Tarte tropézienne, also known as "La Tarte de Saint-Tropez", is a dessert pastry consisting of a halved brioche filled with lemon and vanilla pastry cream and topped with pearl sugar. It was created in 1955 by Polish confectioner Alexandre Micka, a pâtisserie owner in Saint-Tropez, where he moved in 1945 just after the war.

Alexandre Micka adapted a family recipe (the legend says it was his grandmother's recipe) to create its first version of tarte tropézienne in 1952. A few years later, while offering a variety of desserts in his pastry shop in the Southern city of Saint-Tropez, actress Brigitte Bardot falls under the spell of the pastry while she was there filming And God Created Woman. It was in fact named after her and popularized after she "discovered" it. In 1973, Micka officially register the trademark.

Micka's original pâtisserie, La Tarte Tropézienne, still exists. Micka learnt the recipe from his Polish grandmother. Since the 1970s, the same dessert has also been popular in Prague, where it is known as the "Prague cake" (Pražský koláč). It is not known whether this cake was baked in Bohemia earlier than in France.

References

External links

French pastries
Cultural depictions of Brigitte Bardot